Titanidiops is a genus of armored trapdoor spiders that was first described by Eugène Louis Simon in 1903.  it contains 9 species.

Species
 it contains 9 species:
 Titanidiops briodae (Schenkel, 1937) — Zimbabwe
 Titanidiops canariensis Wunderlich, 1992 — Canary Is.
 Titanidiops compactus (Gerstaecker, 1873) (type) — East Africa
 Titanidiops constructor (Pocock, 1900) — India
 Titanidiops fortis (Pocock, 1900) — India
 Titanidiops lacustris (Pocock, 1897) — Tanzania
 Titanidiops maroccanus Simon, 1909 — Morocco
 Titanidiops melloleitaoi (Caporiacco, 1949) — Kenya
 Titanidiops syriacus (O. Pickard-Cambridge, 1870) — Syria, Israel

See also
 List of Idiopidae species

References

Idiopidae
Mygalomorphae genera
Spiders of Africa